The 1988 UCLA Bruins softball team represented the University of California, Los Angeles in the 1988 NCAA Division I softball season.  The Bruins were coached by Sharron Backus, who led her fourteenth season.  The Bruins played their home games at Sunset Field and finished with a record of 53–8.  They competed in the Pacific-10 Conference, where they finished first with a 15–3 record.

The Bruins were invited to the 1988 NCAA Division I softball tournament, where they swept the West Regional and then completed a run through the Women's College World Series to claim their third NCAA Women's College World Series Championship.  The Bruins had earlier claimed an AIAW title in 1978 and NCAA titles in 1982 and 1984.

Personnel

Roster

Coaches

Schedule

References

UCLA
UCLA Bruins softball seasons
1988 in sports in California
Women's College World Series seasons
NCAA Division I softball tournament seasons
Pac-12 Conference softball champion seasons